The Holocaust Industry: Reflections on the Exploitation of Jewish Suffering is a 2000 book by Norman Finkelstein arguing that the American Jewish establishment exploits the memory of the Nazi Holocaust for political and financial gain and to further Israeli interests. According to Finkelstein, this "Holocaust industry" has corrupted Jewish culture and the authentic memory of the Holocaust.

The book was controversial, attracting praise and criticism. While supporters describe the book as a substantive engagement with issues such as the politics of memory, critics argue that it either reuses antisemitic tropes, empowers them, or does both, and that the book's style is harsh and not respectful enough considering the delicate subject.

Conception 
The book began as a journal review of The Holocaust in American Life, by Peter Novick.

Finkelstein on the book
Finkelstein states that his consciousness of "the Nazi holocaust" is rooted in his parents' experiences in the Warsaw Ghetto; with the exception of his parents themselves, "every family member on both sides was exterminated by the Nazis". Nonetheless, during his childhood, no one ever asked any questions about what his mother and father had suffered. He suggests,  "This was not a respectful silence. It was indifference." It was only after the establishment of "the Holocaust industry", he suggests, that outpourings of anguish over the plight of the Jews in World War II began.  This ideology in turn served to endow Israel with a status as "'victim' state" despite its "horrendous" human rights record.

According to Finkelstein, his book is "an anatomy and an indictment of the Holocaust industry". He argues that "'The Holocaust' is an ideological representation of the Nazi holocaust".

In the foreword to the first paperback edition, Finkelstein notes that the first hardback edition had been a considerable hit in several European countries and many languages, but had been largely ignored in the United States. He sees The New York Times as the main promotional vehicle of the "Holocaust industry", and says that the 1999 Index listed 273 entries for the Holocaust and just 32 entries for the entire continent of Africa.

Chapters
Chapter 1: Capitalizing The Holocaust - by the 1980s, Finkelstein states, the "War against the Jews" had become more important to American cultural life than the "War Between the States". (p. 11)
Chapter 2: Hoaxers, Hucksters and History - in 1967, Finkelstein claims that two concepts appeared in public discourse: The uniqueness of the Holocaust, and the concept of the Holocaust as climax of a historical irrational anti-Semitic tendency in Europe. Finkelstein asserts that these concepts became central to the "Holocaust Industry", but that neither figures in scholarship of the Nazi Holocaust. (p. 13)
Chapter 3: The Double Shakedown - in this chapter, Finkelstein claims that the number of Jewish survivors of the Holocaust recognized by relief groups increased from c. 100,000 in 1945 to nearly 1 million owing to definitional changes in who was considered to be a survivor. Because of this, Finkelstein repeatedly asserts that fraudulent claims were made on Switzerland, while accounts and assets in the US and Israel were ignored. Payments were made to organizations instead of to real individual survivors.
The second (2003) edition contained 100 pages of new material, primarily in chapter 3 on the World Jewish Congress lawsuit against Swiss banks. Finkelstein set out to provide a guide to the relevant sections of the case. He feels that the presiding judge elected not to docket crucial documents, and that the Claims Resolution Tribunal could no longer be trusted. Finkelstein claims the CRT was on course to vindicate the Swiss banks before it changed tack in order to "protect the blackmailers' reputation".

Reviews and critiques
The book has been controversial, receiving a number of both positive and negative reviews. The Holocaust historian Raul Hilberg praised Finkelstein's book:

Israeli historian Moshe Zuckermann welcomed his book as an "irreplaceable critique of the ‘instrumentalisation of the past’ and underlined its ‘liberating potential’".

Oren Baruch Stier reviewing the book for the journal Prooftexts summarized the book as a "small and pungent manifesto" and concluded his review by writing that "there are worthwhile arguments here, if one can stomach the bile in which they float".

Enzo Traverso reviewing the book for the journal Historical Materialism wrote that the book has proven controversial, concluding that it "contains a core of truth that must be recognised, but it lends itself, due to its style and several of its main arguments, to the worst uses and instrumentalisations." He suggested that the book should be seen as an opportunity for stimulating public debates about difficult topics related to "the politics of memory and on the public uses of history"

Donald D. Denton reviewing the book for Terrorism and Political Violence journal noted that it "will be valuable as an historical piece of research and of interest to those who now attempt to deal with the contemporary genocides and the subsequent generations of children of those who endured such horrors".

According to Israeli journalist Yair Sheleg, in August 2000, German historian Hans Mommsen called it "a most trivial book, which appeals to easily aroused anti-Semitic prejudices."

Wolfgang Benz stated to Le Monde: "It is impossible to learn anything from Finkelstein's book. At best, it is interesting for a psychotherapist." Jean Birnbaum publishing in the same venue added that Norman Finkelstein "hardly cares about nuance" and Rony Brauman wrote in the preface to the French edition (L'Industrie de l'Holocauste, Paris, La Fabrique, 2001) that some assertions of Finkelstein (especially on the impact of the Six-days war) are wrong, others being pieces of "propaganda".

Historian Peter Novick, whose work Finkelstein described as providing the "initial stimulus" for The Holocaust Industry, said in the July 28, 2000 issue of London's The Jewish Chronicle that Finkelstein's book is replete with "false accusations", "egregious misrepresentations", "absurd claims" and "repeated mis-statements" ("A charge into darkness that sheds no light"). Finkelstein replied to the allegations by Novick on his website, replying to five "specific charges", and criticizing his opponents' "intellectual standards".

Hasia Diner described Peter Novick and Finkelstein of being "harsh critics of American Jewry from the left," and challenged the notion in their books that American Jews did not begin to commemorate the Holocaust until after 1967.

Wolfgang Wippermann criticized Finkelstein as "‘a useful idiot’ for all kinds of anti-semites."

Andrew Ross, reviewing the book for Salon, wrote:

Alvin Hirsch Rosenfeld wrote that The Holocaust Industry "is representative of a polemical engagement with the Holocaust" that places it in line with a number of other works  by "critics of Holocaust consciousness, all of whom stress the utilitarian function of memory", and who see many modern references to The Holocaust as "means of enhancing ethnic identity and advancing political agendas of one kind or another". Rosenfeld also noted that the book presents those ideas in a very "harsh and inflammatory way."

Jonathan Freedland in a column for The Guardian wrote that unlike Novick's book, The Holocaust Industry does not share its "sensitivity or human empathy - surely prerequisites of any meaningful debate about the Holocaust". Freedland accused Finkelstein of having constructed "an elaborate conspiracy theory, in which the Jews were pushed from apathy to obsession about the Holocaust by a corrupt Jewish leadership bent on building international support for Israel".

It has been suggested that the book "probably cost its author... tenure at DePaul University".

Finkelstein's response to critics
Finkelstein responded to his critics in the foreword to the second edition (published in 2003), writing "Mainstream critics allege that I conjured a 'conspiracy theory' while those on the Left ridicule the book as a defense of 'the banks'. None, so far as I can tell, question my actual findings."

Selected publication history

 2000; First edition, Verso Books (London) 150 p. Hardcover, 
 2003; Second edition expanded, Verso Books (London) 286 p. Paperback,

See also
 Image and Reality of the Israel–Palestine Conflict
 Jewish lobby
 Nazi gold

References

External links
Author's web page for the book
Review by Tanweer Akram, an economist at Columbia University

"The business of death" (Extracted from The Holocaust Industry by Norman G Finkelstein), The Guardian (Wednesday July 12, 2000).
"Swiss toll II", (Extracted from The Holocaust Industry by Norman G Finkelstein), The Guardian (Thursday July 13, 2000).
"It Takes an Enormous Amount of Courage to Speak the Truth When No One Else is Out There" -- World-Renowned Holocaust, Israel Scholars Defend DePaul Professor Norman Finkelstein as He Fights for Tenure (Raul Hilberg and Avi Shlaim speak in support of Norman Finkelstein's scholarship and "The Holocaust Industry" specifically.)

2000 non-fiction books
American political books
Books by Norman Finkelstein
Books critical of Zionism
English-language books
Holocaust historiography
Verso Books books